The Beaulieu Formation is a geologic formation in France. It preserves fossils dating back to the Devonian period.

See also

 List of fossiliferous stratigraphic units in France

References
 

Devonian France
Devonian southern paleotemperate deposits
Devonian southern paleotropical deposits